Harpalus lethierryi is a species of ground beetle in the subfamily Harpalinae. It was described by Reiche in 1860.

References

lethierryi
Beetles described in 1860